Yeats Country is a 1965 Irish short documentary film directed by Patrick Carey. At the 38th Academy Awards, it received a nomination for Best Documentary Short.

References

External links

Watch Yeats Country at the Irish Film Institute

1965 films
1965 documentary films
1965 short films
1960s short documentary films
Irish short documentary films
W. B. Yeats
1960s English-language films